Steven Ehrlich, FAIA, RIBA (born June 12, 1946) is an American architect based in Culver City, California. He is the founding partner of the practice Ehrlich Yanai Rhee Chaney Architects, formerly known as Ehrlich Architects.

Life and career
Ehrlich was born in New York City in 1946 and grew up in the Radburn section of Fair Lawn, New Jersey. He graduated from Rensselaer Polytechnic Institute in 1969. Upon graduating, Ehrlich spent six years working in Africa, serving for two years in the Peace Corps as its first architect in Marrakesh, Morocco. Ehrlich traveled across the Sahara and taught architecture at Ahmadu Bello University in Nigeria. He admired the simplicity and effectiveness of the vernacular architecture that he encountered in Africa. Ehrlich moved to Venice, California in 1979 and established a small residential studio.  The influence from African architecture and the diverse environment of Los Angeles  led to a trademarked design philosophy that Ehrlich coined "multicultural modernism," which advocates a sensitivity to the local culture in the process of design. Ehrlich's studio has developed into an internationally renowned firm, now called Ehrlich Yanai Rhee Chaney Architects, which engages in residential, civic, commercial, and educational work. His forty-people firm was awarded the 2015 AIA National Architecture Firm Award and the 2003 AIA California Council Firm Award.

Academics
Ehrlich has taught at Ahmadu Bello University, Montana State University, SCI-Arc, and UCLA. He is currently a visiting professor at the USC School of Architecture. He has been a visiting design critic at Harvard University, Yale University, and Woodbury University.

Major projects

Completed
 Ahmadu Bello University Theater, Zaria, Nigeria, 1976
 700 Palms Residence, Venice, CA, 2004
 Walter Cronkite School of Journalism and Mass Communication, Phoenix, AZ, 2008
 UC Irvine Contemporary Arts Center, Irvine, CA, 2010
 ASU School of Earth and Space Exploration, Tempe, AZ, 2012
 John M. Roll United States Courthouse, Yuma, AZ, 2013
 McElroy Residence, Long Beach, CA, 2013
 Kalfus Guest House, 2456 Astral Drive, Hollywood Hills, Los Angeles, CA

In progress
FNC Parliament Complex, Abu Dhabi, UAE.

Awards and honors
Maybeck Award, AIA California Council / 2011
Gold Medal, AIA Los Angeles / 2015

References

External links
Ehrlich Yanai Rhee Chaney Architects - Official Website

1946 births
University of Southern California faculty
Rensselaer Polytechnic Institute alumni
Living people
Architects from New York City
People from Fair Lawn, New Jersey
People from Venice, Los Angeles
People from Culver City, California
Architects from California